Crook National Forest was established in Arizona by the U.S. Forest Service on July 1, 1908, with  from portions of Tonto National Forest, Mount Graham National Forest, and other lands.  On July 1, 1953, Crook was divided among Tonto, Gila, and Coronado National Forests.

References

External links
Forest History Society
Forest History Society:Listing of the National Forests of the United States Text from Davis, Richard C., ed. Encyclopedia of American Forest and Conservation History. New York: Macmillan Publishing Company for the Forest History Society, 1983. Vol. II, pp. 743-788.

Former National Forests of Arizona